Yaacov Haber is a  rabbi has taught Jews about Jewish heritage for almost thirty years.

Biography
Rabbi Haber was ordained in Jerusalem by Rabbi Chaim Pinchas Scheinberg of Yeshivah Torah Ore and by Chacham Avrohom Ochana of Yeshivah Ahavat Shalom.

After his ordination in Israel, Rabbi Haber returned to his hometown of Buffalo, New York in 1979 with his family to found the Torah Center of Buffalo. During his ten years in Buffalo he served as spiritual leader, first of the Amherst Synagogue and later at Congregation Achei Tmimim (also known as the Saranac Synagogue).

From there he went to Melbourne, Australia where the Rabbi founded the Australian Institute of Torah, an adult education program.

Rabbi Haber then returned to the United States to become the National Director of Jewish Education for the Orthodox Union. He created learning programs such as the Pardes Project.

Rabbi Haber was the Rav of Bais Torah Congregation in Monsey, New York where he succeeded Rabbi Berel Wein.

Currently, Rabbi Haber serves as President of Mosaica Press.

He is the author of books in English and Hebrew.

Since Rosh Hashana 5769 (2008), Rabbi Haber has held the position of Rabbi of Kehillas Shivtei Yeshurun in Ramat Beit Shemesh, where he currently lives with his wife, Bayle, and children.

Trivia
On February 12, 2009, Rabbi Haber was booked aboard Colgan Air Flight 3407 from Newark, NJ, to Buffalo, NY, but was forced to miss the flight because powerful winds prevented him from driving to the airport.  The flight crashed on arrival in Buffalo, killing all 49 people on board.

He lives in Ramat Bet Shemesh.

PublicationsConversation of TorahSefiros: Spiritual Refinement Through Counting the Omer (With David Sedley) (TorahLab Publishers: 2008/ Judaica Press 2009) (150 pp.)Lev Avos on Pirkei Avos (Hebrew) (TorahLab Publishers: 2007)Reachings - Talks on TorahCritical Issues for Jews of TodayThe First Ten DaysChidushei Rav Yosef Engel al HaTorah (Hebrew)New Heights in Jewish Prayer With 44 Hours of Audio''

References

External links
 
 TorahLab, Rabbi Haber's homepage
 Short Bio & Free MP3 Lectures by Rabbi Yaacov Haber
 Kehillas Shivtei Yeshurun
 Mosaica Press

American Orthodox rabbis
Living people
Year of birth missing (living people)
Beit Shemesh
People from Monsey, New York
Religious leaders from Buffalo, New York
21st-century American Jews